GKV may refer to:
 G. K. Venkatesh (1927–1993), Indian composer
 Gurukul Kangri Vishwavidyalaya, a university in the city of Haridwar, Uttarakhand, India
 Reformed Churches in the Netherlands (Liberated)